Julius Goldie Goldman (born September 22, 1910, in Mayesville, South Carolina, and died February 19, 2001, in Detroit, Michigan) was a Canadian basketball player.

A father of modern basketball, Canada's representative on the 1936 Olympic Basketball Rules Committee, Julius Goldman suggested the elimination of the basketball rule that called for a "jump ball" after every field goal. The 1936 games marked basketball's first appearance in the Olympics. The Rules Committee agreed with Goldman (the lone objecting vote was that of basketball's creator Dr. James Naismith), and the game was forever changed.  This rule change has been credited with modernizing basketball; speeding up the pace of the game, increasing scoring and making teams with shorter centers more competitive.  In 1958, NCAA rules committee chairman Ed Steitz credited Goldman's rule change as the most radical change in the entire evolution of basketball.

Goldman was born in 1910 in Mayesville, South Carolina to Lithuanian immigrants Isaac and Rebecca Goldman.  The family moved to Canada when Julius was two. Goldman captained and was the leading scorer for the Windsor Ford V-8's team that won Canada's 1935–36 national championship, qualifying them to represent Canada in the 1936 Berlin Olympics. However, Goldman's U.S. citizenship made him ineligible to play for another country, so he was made an assistant coach and appointed Canada's representative to the Olympic Basketball Rules Committee.  The Canadian Basketball team won a silver medal, losing 19–8 to the US in the muddy gold medal game in a driving rainstorm outdoors.

Playing career

Goldman was a four sport star (basketball, track, baseball and hockey) at W. D. Lowe High School (at that time Windsor-Walkerville Tech).  After high school, he crossed the border to attend Detroit Institute of Technology (Detroit Tech) from 1928 to 1932.  He was the national collegiate basketball scoring leader in 1932.  He was named the top student athlete and a legendary college player.  In total, Goldman's teams amassed 36 championships.

Coaching/Officiating career

From 1937 to 1950, Goldman was a math teacher, athletic director and basketball coach at his alma mater Detroit Tech. He led the basketball team to a 143–75 record.  For 43 years, he officiated basketball and football for the Detroit Catholic Schools Association.

Professional career

Goldman worked for Smith, Hinchman & Grylls in Detroit as a principal designer of ammunition.  An electrical engineer with a master's degree in business engineering, Goldman designed and developed the 155 mm howitzer anti-tank shell during World War II that allowed the Allied Forces to turn the 1944 tide against Germany's "invincible" Tiger tanks.  He later worked as an executive with both Federal Engineering and Fisher Body in Detroit, retiring in 1965.  He then resumed his teaching career at Oakland Community College in 1970, teaching math until he finally retired for good in 1995 at the age of 85.

Personal life

Goldman was married to Ann Goldman (née Warsh) (1913–1990).  They had two children; a son Alan (1940–2011) and daughter Nancy Kushkin (1944–   ), and seven grandchildren.

Awards
1950 – Mensa membership (98% or above on standardized IQ test)

1969 – Named "Official of the Year" (DCSA)

1973 – Named top student-athlete of the century (1872–1972) at W.D. Lowe Secondary School

1977 – Inducted to International Jewish Sports Hall of Fame

1978 – Inducted to Detroit Catholic High School League Hall of Fame

1981 – Inducted to Naismith Basketball Hall of Fame

1981 – Inducted to Canadian Basketball Hall of Fame

1990 – Inducted to the Windsor-Essex County Sports Hall of Fame

1991 – Inducted to Michigan Jewish Sports Hall of Fame

2017 – Inducted to Lawrence Tech (formerly Detroit Tech) Hall of Fame

See also
 Basketball at the 1936 Summer Olympics
List of Jews in sports (non-players)

References 

2001 deaths
1910 births
American men's basketball players
American expatriate basketball people in Canada
American football officials
Basketball referees in the United States
Canadian men's basketball coaches
Detroit Institute of Technology alumni
Detroit Tech Dynamics football coaches
International Jewish Sports Hall of Fame inductees
Jewish American sportspeople
Sports inventors and innovators
People from Mayesville, South Carolina
20th-century American Jews